Heretaunga Street is the main arterial road through Hastings City in New Zealand running from north-west to south-east.

Description

It starts in Havelock North where it goes under the name Havelock Road, and runs for 2.3 km (1.43 Miles) until it officially goes by the name Heretaunga Street; it then runs for another  until it stops at Russell Street where the railway line runs through the city and through the city's fountain. Then the street continues for another  as a pedestrian mall, where the road is a large public footpath, tree garden and café seating area. Then, from Railway Road for another  as Heretaunga Street. Then at the area known as Stortford Lodge, at a road called Maraekakaho Rd, a ring road then changes the name to Omahu Road, where it continues for another  where it reaches State Highway 50 at a place called Omahu, hence the name of the street.

The road is mostly two lanes wide (one lane in each direction) and has a parking shoulders on either side.

The location where the road intersects with the railway line has for generations been regarded as the centrepiece of Hastings. It is here where the Hastings Clock Tower was built after the 1931 Hawke's Bay earthquake, and the short pedestrian mall is located here. The clock tower is registered as a Category I heritage building with Heritage New Zealand. A night market is held on Thursdays in the mall, organised by the Hastings City Business Association.

History
Heretaunga Street was regarded as Hastings' main street from as early as the 1880s. It has suffered several disasters since that time, including major fires in February 1893 and May 1907. Along with much of the rest of Hastings, the street was devastated by the Hawke's Bay earthquake of 3 February 1931.

Heritage buildings
Most of the heritage buildings in Hastings as listed by Heritage New Zealand are within the central business district, and the streets that have most of them are Queen Street West, Heretaunga Street West, and Russell Street. Where Russell Street intercepts Heretaunga Street, there is in addition an historic area designation by Heritage New Zealand. The following table lists the registered heritage buildings that have a frontage onto Heretaunga Street.

Albert Hotel on the corner of Karamu Street and Heretaunga Street East was Hastings' oldest building, and registered as a Category II building. It was derelict and had sat empty for some years before it was demolished in December 2014.

Traffic
Hawke's Bay has a lower population for its size and is not very prone to traffic problems. The gridiron plan of central Hastings lets traffic move easily. The pedestrian strip near the centre of the city makes parking down Heretaunga Street generally very challenging, as there is no major parking lot or a parking garage nearby. Heretaunga Street favours roundabouts, as there are 14 of them crossing intersections, compared to only two sets of traffic lights.

Importance as a road
Heretaunga Street is known as the biggest of the main north–south arteries in Hastings, being the only one that goes straight from Flaxmere to Havelock North. The road is also the only one that runs through the middle of the Central Business Districts and is home to much of Hastings' commerce and trade, where at the centre of the Street, at the CBD it is a 2.2 kilometre shopping strip, and at the very centre in the town fountain and clock tower is a pedestrian-only section where large stores meet cafés, restaurants and tall office blocks. This is generally known as the 'downtown' or 'central city' of Hastings.

References

Streets in Hastings, New Zealand
Shopping districts and streets in New Zealand